The 1998–99 Vyshcha Liha season was the 8th since its establishment. FC Dynamo Kyiv were the defending champions.

Teams

Promotions
SC Mykolaiv, the champion of the 1997–98 Ukrainian First League  – (returning after absence of two seasons)
Metalist Kharkiv, the third-place runner-up of the 1997–98 Ukrainian First League  – (returning after absence of four seasons)

Location

Managers

Notes: Games between Dynamo Kyiv and CSKA Kyiv were played at Republican Stadium.

Changes

League table

Results

Top goalscorers

Notable Transfers
Andriy Shevchenko, FC Dynamo Kyiv to A.C. Milan
Oleksandr Palyanytsia, FC Karpaty Lviv to FC Kryvbas Kryvyi Rih
Ihor Kostiuk, FC Vorskla Poltava to FC Dynamo-2 Kyiv

External links
ukrsoccerhistory.com - source of information

Ukrainian Premier League seasons
1998–99 in Ukrainian association football leagues
Ukra